Central Salt and Marine Chemicals Research Institute (formerly Central Salt Research Institute) is a constituent laboratory of the Council of Scientific and Industrial Research (CSIR), India. The institute was inaugurated by Jawahar Lal Nehru on 10 April 1954 at Bhavnagar, in Gujarat.

Technology developed
 Preparations of nutrient-rich salt of plant origins
 Electrodialysis domestic desalination system
 Preparation of novel iodizing agent
 "CleanWrite" writing chalk
 Preparation of low sodium salt of botanic origin
 Plastic Chip Electrodes [3, 4].

Research activity
Molecular sensors for selective recognition of cations/anions
Recognition of analytes and neutral molecules in physiological condition
Supramolecular metal complexes to study photo-induced energy/electron transfer processes
Nanocrystalline dye-sensitized solar cells (DSSC)
Smart Materials
 Tailored and modified electrodes.
Green Chemistry
Polymer Chemistry and development of novel drug delivery system
Pharmaceutical Biotechnology and Natural products 
Recovery of precious metal ions from natural sources
Crystal engineering
Computational Study
 Electrochemical/chemical value addition processes
 Development of polyethylene based inter polymer membranes and design of electrodialysis units

References

3. Polymer–graphite composite: a versatile use and throw plastic chip electrode; Mosarrat Perween, Dilip B. Parmar, Gopala Ram Bhadu, Divesh N. Srivastava; Analyst, 139 (2014) 5919-5926.

4. An improved next generation off-laboratory polymer chip electrode USA [US20170082576; A1]

Research institutes in Gujarat
Council of Scientific and Industrial Research
Education in Bhavnagar
Salt industry in India
Research institutes established in 1954
1954 establishments in Bombay State

External Links
1. About CSMCRI